Quotient Technology, Inc. was founded in 1998 and is headquartered in Mountain View, CA. Founded by Steven Boal, CEO, & Executive Chairman of the Board of Quotient, Quotient Technology, Inc. was formerly known as Coupons.com Incorporated. Quotient Technology offers digital coupons, including online printable, social, mobile and loyalty card promotions. Sunday newspapers have traditionally been the dominant distribution method for coupons; in 2009 it was estimated by Coupons.com that approximately half of the redeemed coupons in the United States originated from weekly supplements in Sunday papers. In June 2011, after receiving approximately $200 million of new investment, Coupon.com's value was estimated at a billion dollars. In October 2011, Greylock Partners announced an investment of up to $30 million in a secondary market purchase of company shares. In June 2012, Bay Area News Group named Coupons.com to its list of Top Workplaces 2012.

Products
Quotient Technology's clients include consumer packaged goods brands,  restaurant, toy and entertainment companies, as well as general retailers, and also has an affiliate marketing program called Brandcaster which is aimed at long tail users.
In November 2010, Yahoo announced that it was including coupons.com offers in its local deals. In June 2013 Coupons.com released the KitchMe app for Google Glass, the first cooking application for Google Glass.  With the KitchMe app users can search for recipes, make shopping lists, and receive step-by-step cooking instructions.

Valuation 
Coupons.com is being tracked as one of the 30 companies in China, Europe, and the United States valued at $1 billion or more by venture-capital firms. Coupons.com went public with $100 million IPO in January 2014 with NYSE trading under COUP. In 2015, Coupons.com changed its corporate name to Quotient Technology Inc (NYSE: QUOT), but continues to operate its website as Coupons.com.

Acquisitions 
Quotient Technology has acquired 10 organizations in total: Ubimo, Elevaate, Ahalogy, Crisp Mobile, Shopmium, Eckim, Yub, KitchMe, Couponstar, and Grocery iQ. The most recent acquisition was of Ubimo on Nov 7, 2019.

References

Marketing companies of the United States
Reward websites
Companies listed on the New York Stock Exchange
Companies based in Mountain View, California
Internet properties established in 1998
2014 initial public offerings